The Speaker of the Norfolk Legislative Assembly was the presiding officer of the Norfolk Legislative Assembly.

In absence of the Speaker, the speaker pro tempore or deputy speaker, was designated to fill in.

List of speakers

This is a list of presidents (from 1995: speakers) of the Norfolk Legislative Assembly) until the abolition of the assembly in 2015:

Footnotes and references

 
Norfolk Island
Norfolk
Norfolk